

AW70

The AW70 is a 4 speed fully automatic transmission used in the Volvo 240, 740 and 940 series cars starting from 1982 up to 1997, with the end of production of the 940. From the 1989 model year a lock-up torque converter was offered which changed the designation to AW70L.  This transmission was originally used in the US specification 1982 Volvo 240 with the B21F engine, as well as in 1983 with the B23F engine.  The AW70 did not see worldwide usage until 1984 in certain 240 series cars. The AW70 transmission was not the only automatic transmission used in cars of this era. Some of the 1985-87 B230F-equipped 740's came with a ZF 4HP22 transmission (designated by a gearshift labeled "P R N D 3 2 1"). The AW70 (gearshift labeled "P R N D 2 1" with a side-mounted overdrive lockout) is widely considered significantly more reliable than the ZF 4HP22 transmission.

AW71

The AW71 and AW71L was a strengthened version of the AW70 transmission used in the Volvo 760, 940, and some 740s and 240s with turbocharged and higher-output naturally aspirated engines.  Some have been seen in 1985-87 240s with the B230F engine.  Also was used in late model European-spec Volvo 260 series cars.  North American market Volvo 260 cars used the Borg Warner Type 55 transmission.

Identical to the Toyota A43D and A43DL except with different tailshaft housings and tailshaft flanges, both of which are interchangeable.

AW72

An automatic gearbox built by Aisin of Japan used the Volvo 16-valve B234F 4-cylinder engine found in the 740 GLE. This gearbox is a modified AW71 with different ratios to leverage the unique power curve characteristics produced by the 16-valve head (when compared to the 8-valve B230F/FT with an AW71 gearbox).

Identical to the Toyota A44DL except with different tailshaft housings and tailshaft flanges, both of which are interchangeable.

Gear Ratios

References

Volvo Cars
Volvo transmissions